KFMN (FM97 at 96.9) is a radio station broadcasting an Adult Contemporary music format. Licensed to Lihue, Hawaii, United States, the station serves the Kauai area and parts of Oahu.  The station is currently owned by FM 97 Associates and features programming from AP Radio.  KFMN-FM1 in Waimea provides an on frequency simulcast of KFMN Lihue.

References

External links

FMN
Mainstream adult contemporary radio stations in the United States
Radio stations established in 1968
1968 establishments in Hawaii